The Brazilian laniisoma  (Laniisoma elegans), also known as the shrike-like laniisoma, the shrike-like cotinga or the elegant mourner, is a species of bird in the family Tityridae. As suggested by its common name, it was formerly considered a cotinga. As it is far from being "shrike-like", this means that the widely used common name is entirely misleading.

It is found in Atlantic forest in eastern Brazil. It was formerly considered as conspecific with the Andean laniisoma (Laniisoma buckleyi) that occurs in humid Andean forests in Venezuela, Colombia, Ecuador, Peru and Bolivia. The Brazilian laniisoma is monotypic.

References

Brazilian laniisoma
Birds of the Atlantic Forest
Endemic birds of Brazil
Brazilian laniisoma
Taxonomy articles created by Polbot